Lifestyling is the practice of reducing the risk of a pension or other investment as the end of the term approaches, typically by shifting to less volatile and lower-risk investment funds.

References 

 Description of lifestyling from Scottish Life

Pensions